Harpobittacus septentrionis is a species of insect in the family Bittacidae found on the north-east coast of Australia.

Description
Harpobittacus septentrionis is about 30mm in length, with a bright orange head and thorax. The abdomen is orange with black ventral and dorsal markings. The legs are orange, black at the joints and claws. It has two sets of membranous wings as distinct from a true fly which has one set.

Distribution
Harpobittacus septentrionis has only been recorded on the ranges and adjacent inland in north-east Queensland from around Mackay to Cairns.

Habit
Harpobittacus septentrionis hang from plants by the two forelegs, and capture prey using their hind and middle legs.

References

Hangingflies
Insects of Australia